Acacia laricina is a shrub belonging to the genus Acacia and the subgenus Phyllodineae that is endemic to south western Australia.

Description
Like most species of Acacia it has phyllodes rather than true leaves. The evergreen  phyllodes are crowded and appear to be continuous with the branchlets. It produces cream-yellow flowers from October to November. The simple inflorescences occur singly in the axils an have sperical flower-heads that contain 17 to 30 cream to pale yellow coloured flowers. Following flowering thinly coriaceous seed pods are formed.

Taxonomy
There are two recognized varieties:
Acacia laricina var. crassifolia
Acacia laricina var. laricina

Distribution
It is native to an area in the southern Wheatbelt, Great Southern and Goldfields-Esperance regions of Western Australia where it has an uneven distribution from around Nyabing in the north west to around Ravensthorpe in the south east. It is commonly situated on flats, stony ridges, on granite hills  and among granite outcrops growing in loamy and gravelly soils often over laterite.

See also
List of Acacia species

References

laricina
Acacias of Western Australia
Taxa named by Carl Meissner
Plants described in 1844